Jackson Borges de Jesus (born 16 September 1987), known as Jackson Borges, Jackson Five or simply Jackson, is a Brazilian footballer who plays for Batatais as a forward

Career statistics

References

External links

1987 births
Living people
Brazilian footballers
Association football forwards
Campeonato Brasileiro Série B players
Rio Claro Futebol Clube players
Clube Atlético Metropolitano players
Ituano FC players
São Carlos Futebol Clube players
Associação Atlética Flamengo players
Associação Desportiva São Caetano players
Sociedade Esportiva Matonense players
Anápolis Futebol Clube players
Uberlândia Esporte Clube players
São José Esporte Clube players
Batatais Futebol Clube players